Capitán Nicolas Rojas Airport is an extremely high elevation airport serving the city of Potosí, the capital of the Potosí Department in Bolivia.

The Potosi non-directional beacon (Ident: POI) is located on the field.

Airlines and destinations

See also
Transport in Bolivia
List of airports in Bolivia

References

External links
Potosí Airport at OpenStreetMap
Potosí Airport at OurAirports

Airports in Potosí Department